Sherlock Holmes is a Russian television crime drama series based on the Sherlock Holmes detective stories by Arthur Conan Doyle and aired in November 2013. Some of the stories have never been adapted before. It stars Igor Petrenko as Sherlock Holmes and Andrei Panin as Doctor John Watson. Eight episodes were produced.

This is the last film role of Andrei Panin, who died before he was able to complete the dubbing of his lines as Dr. Watson. However, they were able to finish the film almost entirely using the sound recorded on set, with only a small contribution by another voice actor.

Background 
London in the 19th century is a grimy, dirty, dangerous place. Twenty-seven-year-old Sherlock Holmes (Igor Petrenko) meets with Dr. John Watson (Andrei Panin) - a veteran Army doctor who has just returned from the war in Afghanistan. They both live in cramped rented rooms in central London at a boarding house run by Mrs Hudson (Ingeborga Dapkūnaitė). Considering his young detective friend to be a genius, Watson decides to write about the detective's talent, and discloses the mysteries to the whole world in his stories, which often embellish events, based on the cynical advice of a veteran Publisher (Alexander Adabashyan) with a keen sense of what sells.

The real Holmes is an awkward, intense, nerdy younger man. His violin playing sounds terrible, and he is neither a martial arts expert nor a crack shot Dr Watson makes him out to be. In fact, he doesn't even own a gun. Sherlock Holmes smokes cigarettes, but Watson comes up with the idea of the famous pipe for effect. The trademark Sherlock Holmes hat and cape were made up by Watson, as was Holmes' upper-class background. Neither of them is well off.

The two are often invited to take part in investigations by an inspector from Scotland Yard, Inspector Lestrade (Mikhail Boyarsky), whose search for the perpetrator often comes to a standstill. The genius investigator and the Doctor confront extraordinary villains: Professor Moriarty (Alexei Gorbunov), charming Pesutova Baba (Lyanka Gryu), and others.

Plot 
The story begins when Dr. Watson, newly arrived and in search of lodging in London, runs into Holmes at the scene of a fatal accident, which Holmes immediately recognizes as murder. He ends up renting a room at Mrs Hudson's, next door to Holmes. Mrs Hudson is a younger and more attractive woman than Watson makes her out to be. She has taken a liking to Watson, but has a problem with Holmes who has no clear occupation and disturbs other tenants with his violin playing and science experiments.

Dr. Watson shortly gets involved in his new friend's life full of exciting and dangerous adventures and becomes his loyal sidekick. He is also trying to build a private medical practice, and to make a name for himself as a writer. His heroic war poetry is turned down by the publisher who convinces him to focus on writing detective stories instead.

Production 

The idea for a new Russian TV series about Sherlock Holmes was first announced in 2009, shortly before the release of Guy Ritchie's Sherlock Holmes. But the choosing of the director and actors was much delayed, and the première was therefore put off for 3 years. The official production of the series only began in 2011.

Andrey Kavun, who is known for his work on the film "Kandahar", was appointed director. Igor Petrenko was chosen for the role of Sherlock, and Andrei Panin was cast as Dr. Watson. For the role of Inspector Lestrade, Mikhail Boyarsky was chosen.

All surveys of Victorian England were held in eight months of filmings Russia, and the filmings were held in the vicinity of St. Petersburg - Vyborg, Kronstadt, Pushkin, Gatchina and Ivangorod. In total, the work on Sherlock Holmes, launched in September 2011, lasted 161 days of shooting. The filming was completed in May 2012 and the production was completed in late October 2012.

Influenced by Guy Ritchie's film, the role of the heroine, Irene Adler, was also expanded on during the show. Her love affair with Sherlock Holmes is one of the series' main storylines. She was portrayed by actress Lyanka Gryu. Kavun has also said he only plans to use the motives of the original stories, but will recreate the stories almost from scratch. The series will also assume that Watson's descriptions of the crimes have been embellished. Later he will try to adjust reality to his fantasies. As an example, Holmes' famous pipe will be replaced by cigarettes.

Unlike most adaptations of Sherlock Holmes, Sherlock in this adaptation is younger than Dr. Watson by 15 years., and the series was aired on channel Russia-1.

Cast

Episodes

Reception

Kim Newman, reviewing the series for Sherlock Holmes Mystery Magazine, described Petrenko's Holmes as looking and acting "more like a revolutionary poet than a detective." While Newman notes where the series diverges from Doyle's canon, he sums "at the end, after all the reimagining, we come back to what is for this version - as for almost all other versions - the heart of the story, the comradeship of two admirable, difficult men in a world of crime, betrayal, love, honour, diabolic cunning and basic decency."

See also
Sherlock in Russia

References

External links

"Sherlock Holmes" on Central Partnership
TV: The New Russian Sherlock Holmes, Sherlocknews.com
Sherlock Holmes Russian-style, The Voice of Russia
Russian "Sherlock Holmes" on 'Kino Teatr 
Sherlock Holmes (2013 TV series) on The Conan Doyle Encyclopedia

Russia-1 original programming
2010s Russian television series
2013 Russian television series debuts
2013 Russian television series endings
Russian drama television series
Russian television miniseries
Russian crime television series
Sherlock Holmes television series
Television shows based on British novels
Sherlock Holmes films based on works by Arthur Conan Doyle
Films shot in Russia
Films set in London
Russian-language television shows
Films directed by Andrey Kavun
Cultural depictions of Queen Victoria on film